Nu Telescopii, Latinized from ν Telescopii, is a slightly evolved star in the southern constellation Telescopium. It has an apparent visual magnitude of 5.33, allowing it to be faintly visible to the naked eye.

There hasn't been much agreement on Nu Telescopii's spectral classification. It was initially categorized as Am star, with a classification of kA4mF3IV: . This indicates that the object has the calcium K-lines of an A4 star and the metallic lines of a F3 subgiant. However, Nu Telescopii was shown not to have a peculiar spectrum and was given a class of A9 Vn, indicating that it is an A-type main-sequence star displaying broad (nebulous) absorption lines due to rapid rotation. It has since been classified as an evolved A7 star with either a blended luminosity class of a giant star or subgiant (III/IV) or only subgiant (IV).

Nu Telescopii's metallicity – what astronomers dub as elements heavier than helium – is around solar level. Its motion in space matches that of the IC 2391 cluster, making it a probable member. 

There is a faint magnitude 9.3 companion star at an angular separation of 102 arc seconds along a position angle of 333°, as of 2010.

References

A-type giants
Telescopii, Nu
Telescopium (constellation)
Durchmusterung objects
186543
097421
7510